The Gasmeth Energy Gas Works (GEGW) is a planned methane gas extraction and processing plant in Rwanda.

Location

Overview
Lake Kivu is reported to contain a considerable amount of methane gas and carbon dioxide, which, when they bubble to the surface, form lethal "toxic clouds". However, when the gases are extracted and canned (bottled), they form vital cooking fuel which replaces scarce firewood and charcoal, thereby preserving the environment. Previous projects have directed the gas towards generation of electricity.

In January 2019, Rwanda's cabinet authorized Rwanda Development Board to enter into a concession with Gasmeth Energy Limited, to extract methane gas for domestic and industrial use as a cooking fuel. On 5 February 2019, agreements were signed, between the Rwanda Development Board (RDB), the Rwanda Mines, Petroleum and Gas Board (RMB) and Gasmeth Energy Limited (GEL), committing GEL to construct a facility on Lake Kivu to extract, process and compress methane gas for the domestic and export market. This is the first major project in the African Great Lakes region for the extraction of methane gas for cooking, on an industrial scale.

Gasmeth Energy Limited
The owner-developers of this project are Gasmeth Energy Limited, a Rwanda-registered company, whose shareholders are as illustrated in the table below.

Construction and funding
Gasmeth has committed in writing to invest US$400 million into the construction of the methane gas plant. It  is expected that commercial operation of the new plant will begin by February 2021.

See also
 Kibuye Power Plant 1
 KivuWatt Power Station
 Kivu 56 Power Station
 Symbion Thermal Power Station

References

External links
 Website of Rwanda Development Board

Energy infrastructure in Rwanda
Western Province, Rwanda
Proposed energy infrastructure in Africa
Natural gas in Rwanda
Liquefied natural gas plants